The 2022 South Dakota gubernatorial election took place on November 8, 2022, electing the governor of South Dakota. Incumbent Republican governor Kristi Noem defeated Democratic nominee Jamie Smith to win a second term.

Despite speculation about this race potentially being competitive, Noem improved on her 2018 performance by 11% and flipped 17 counties that had been won by Billie Sutton. She also received over 44,000 more raw votes than she did in the previous election, setting a record for the most votes received by a candidate for governor in South Dakota.

Republican primary

Candidates

Nominee
Kristi Noem, incumbent Governor
Running mate: Larry Rhoden, incumbent Lieutenant Governor

Eliminated in primary

Steven Haugaard, state representative and former Speaker of the South Dakota House of Representatives

Declined
Lora Hubbel, former state representative, former chair of the Minnehaha County Republican Party and the South Dakota Constitution Party, and candidate for governor in 2014 and 2018 (running as an independent)
Mark Mickelson, former Speaker of the South Dakota House of Representatives

Endorsements

Polling

Results

Democratic primary

Candidates

Nominee 
Jamie Smith, Minority Leader of the South Dakota House of Representatives
Running mate: Jennifer Healy Keintz, state representative

Declined 
 Dan Ahlers, former state representative and nominee for U.S. Senate in 2020
Remi Bald Eagle, former official for the Cheyenne River Sioux Tribe and nominee for the South Dakota Public Utilities Commission in 2020
 Kooper Caraway, president of the South Dakota Federation of Labor
 Steve Hildebrand, political strategist
 Mike Huether, former Mayor of Sioux Falls
Peri Pourier, state representative
 Bob Sutton, businessman
 Troy Heinert, Minority Leader of the South Dakota Senate
 Brendan Johnson, former U.S. Attorney for the District of South Dakota and son of former U.S. Senator Tim Johnson
 Stephanie Herseth Sandlin, president of Augustana University and former U.S. Representative for 
 Randy Seiler, chair of the South Dakota Democratic Party, former U.S. Attorney for the District of South Dakota, and nominee for Attorney General in 2018
 Billie Sutton, former Minority Leader of the South Dakota Senate and nominee for governor in 2018

Libertarian convention

Candidates

Nominee
Tracey Quint, coordinator
Running mate: Ashley Strand

Independents

Candidates

Withdrew 
Lora Hubbel, former state representative, former chair of the Minnehaha County Republican Party and the South Dakota Constitution Party, and candidate for governor in 2014 and 2018 (running for State Senate)

General election

Predictions

Polling

Endorsements

Results

Results By County

Counties that flipped from Democratic to Republican 

 Bon Homme (largest city: Springfield)
 Brookings (largest city: Brookings)
 Brown (largest city: Aberdeen)
 Charles Mix (largest city: Lake Andes)
 Corson (largest city: McLaughlin)
 Day (largest city: Webster)
 Hughes (largest city: Pierre)
 Lake (largest city: Madison)
 Marshall (largest city: Britton)
 Mellette (largest city: White River)
 Miner (largest city: Howard)
 Minnehaha (largest city: Sioux Falls)
 Moody (largest city: Flandreau)
 Roberts (largest city: Sisseton)
 Spink (largest city: Redfield)
 Yankton (largest city: Yankton)
 Ziebach (largest city: Dupree)

See also 
 2022 South Dakota elections

Notes

References

External links 
Official campaign websites
 Kristi Noem (R) for Governor
 Tracey Quint (L) for Governor
 Jamie Smith (D) for Governor

2022
South Dakota
Gubernatorial